Shōjirō, Shojiro or Shoujirou (written: 祥二郎, 象二郎 or 正二郎) is a masculine Japanese given name. Notable people with the name include:

, Japanese samurai and politician
, Japanese general
, Japanese businessman
, Japanese footballer
, Japanese karateka

Japanese masculine given names